The men's track time trial at the 1976 Summer Olympics in Montreal, Canada, was held on July 20, 1976. There were 30 participants from 30 nations, with each nation limited to one cyclist. One additional cyclist, Elmabruk Kehel from Libya, was entered but did not start because of the last-minute boycott from the African countries. The event was won by Klaus-Jürgen Grünke of East Germany, the nation's first victory in the men's track time trial. Michel Vaarten of Belgium took silver. Niels Fredborg became the only man to win three medals in the event, adding a bronze to his 1968 silver and 1972 gold.

Background

This was the 12th appearance of the event, which had previously been held in 1896 and every Games since 1928. It would be held every Games until being dropped from the programme after 2004. The returning cyclists from 1972 were gold medalist (and 1968 silver medalist) Niels Fredborg of Denmark, fifth-place finisher (and 1968 bronze medalist) Janusz Kierzkowski of Poland, sixth-place finisher Dimo Angelov Tonchev of Bulgaria, eighth-place finisher Eduard Rapp of the Soviet Union, fifteenth-place finisher Jocelyn Lovell of Canada, eighteenth-place finisher Harald Bundli of Norway, and non-finisher Hector Edwards of Barbados. Fredborg, Rapp (1974 world champion), and Klaus-Jürgen Grünke (1975 world champion) were favored.

Antigua and Barbuda, Bolivia, Hong Kong, and Yugoslavia each made their debut in the men's track time trial. France and Great Britain each made their 12th appearance, having competed at every appearance of the event.

Competition format

The event was a time trial on the track, with each cyclist competing separately to attempt to achieve the fastest time. Each cyclist raced one kilometre from a standing start.

Records

The following were the world and Olympic records prior to the competition.

No new world or Olympic records were set during the competition.

Schedule

All times are Eastern Daylight Time (UTC-4)

Results

References

External links
 Official Report

T
Cycling at the Summer Olympics – Men's track time trial
Track cycling at the 1976 Summer Olympics